Scott Dunn is a luxury tour operator. The company, founded in 1986, has offices in London in the UK, San Diego in the United States and Singapore, and sells holidays worldwide.

History 
Andrew Dunn founded Scott Dunn in 1986 at age 22 as a luxury ski company operating chalets in the Alps. The company uses an "old family name", Dunn's father and grandfather both being called Scott Dunn. The company grew over the next three decades to offer holidays worldwide.

In 2010 Simon Russell took over as CEO, overseeing the acquisition of Africa, Asia and Latin America specialist Imagine Travel in 2013, the opening of an office in San Diego through the acquisition of Aardvark Safaris in April 2016 and the opening of an office in Singapore in September 2016, enabling the company to operate 24 hours a day. In January 2018 Scott Dunn acquired Country Holidays, a Singapore company with offices in Singapore, Hong Kong, Dubai and China.

Sonia Davies took over as CEO of the company in 2018.

In December 2021 the company slogan was "Travel that takes you further."

Awards 

Scott Dunn was voted best Specialist Tour Operator in the Condé Nast Traveller Readers' Travel Awards 2014, 2015, 2016, 2017, 2018, 2019, 2020 and 2021 and Favourite Tour Operator in the Condé Nast Traveller Readers' Travel Awards 2013, Favourite Specialist Tour Operator in 2011 and Best Family Tour Operator in Junior Magazine's Design Awards in 2013.

References

External links 
 Official Website

Travel and holiday companies of the United Kingdom